Fustanella (for spelling in various languages, see chart below) is a traditional pleated skirt-like garment that is also referred to as a kilt worn by men of many nations in the Balkans (Southeast Europe). In modern times, the fustanella is part of Balkan folk dresses. In Greece, a short version of the fustanella is worn by ceremonial military units such as the Evzones since 1868. In Albania it was worn by the Royal Guard in the interbellum era. Both Greece and Albania claim the fustanella as a national costume. Additionally Aromanians claim the fustanella as their ethnic costume.

Origins

Although the pleated skirt has been linked to an ancient statue (3rd century BC) located in the area around the Acropolis in Athens, no ancient Greek clothing has survived to confirm that the origins of the fustanella are in the pleated garments or chitons worn by men in ancient Athens. However, a 5th-century BC relief statue was discovered in Vari Cave, Attica, by Charles Heald Weller of the American School of Classical Studies at Athens, depicting a stonecutter, Archedemus the Nympholept, wearing a fustanella-like garment; the short tunic he wears is tied in folds in the waist like a fustanella, which was a common practice during agricultural or other manual labor. 

According to other scholars the roots of the fustanella date back to Roman times, when the Albanian/Illyrian kilt became the original pattern of Roman military dress. A terracotta figurine with a fustanella-like garment was found at Durrës in Albania, dating back to the 4th century. Sir Arthur Evans said that the Albanian fustanella of the female peasants (worn over and above the Slavonic apron) living near the modern Bosnian-Montenegrin borders was a preserved Illyrian element among the local Slavic-speaking populations. Baron Franz Nopcsa theorized that the Celtic kilt emerged after the Albanian kilt was introduced to the Celts in Britain by the Roman legions, while folklorist Ioanna Papantoniou considers the Celtic kilt, as viewed by the Roman legions, to have served as the original prototype. 
Kilts were actually not worn by Celtic warriors of Roman times and were introduced in the Scottish Highlands c. 16th Century AD

Other scholars consider that the fustanella originated from the Romans, through a shorter version of the toga or a pleated chiton; as shown in statues of Roman emperors wearing knee-length pleated skirts. With the expansion of the Romans to colder climates in central and northwestern Europe, more folds would be added to provide greater warmth.

In the Byzantine Empire, a pleated skirt known as the podea (Greek: ποδέα) was worn. The wearer of the podea was either associated with a typical hero or an Akritic warrior and can be found in 12th-century finds attributed to Emperor Manuel I Komnenos (r. 1143–1180). 

In his Lexicon of Medieval Latin, Charles du Fresne suggests that fustanum (a piece of cloth) originates from the Roman palla. Cotton  was among the belongings of Pope Urban V (1310–1370).

Usage

Albania

In Albanian territories the fustanella was used centuries before Ottoman rule. A fustanella is depicted on a 13th century proto-maiolica pottery fragment from Durrës. A 14th-century document (1335) listing a series of items including a fustanum (a cloth made of cotton), which were confiscated from a sailor at the port of the Drin River in the Skadar Lake region of Albania. During the Ottoman conquest of Albania in the late 15th century, Albanian Tosks who arrived in southern Italy wore the fustanella which distinguished them from Albanian Ghegs who wore tight breeches. In the 19th century, within the area of contemporary southern Albania and northern Greek Epirus, British traveler John Cam Hobhouse noticed that when traveling from the Greek-speaking area (region south of Delvinaki) into the Albanian-speaking area (to the direction of Gjirokastër and its surrounding environs), apart from different languages a change of clothing occurred. Those Albanian speakers wore the Kamisa shirt and kilt, while Greek speakers wore woolen brogues. The Albanian fustanella was greatly favoured among the Balkan peoples, and it was imitated by many other peoples. According to this view, the spread of the Albanian fustanella among other neighbouring peoples such as the Greeks as well as the Turks, is documented by the historians of the time.

Other British travelers within the region such as Lord Byron celebrated the Albanian costume and described it as "the most magnificent in the world, consisting of long, white kilt, gold-worked cloak, crimson velvet gold laced jacket and waist-coat, silver mounted pistols and daggers". In 1848–1849, British painter Edward Lear traveling within the area of contemporary Albania observed that the fustanella was for Albanians a characteristic national costume. While during the 19th century the use of the fustanella was worn over tight fitting  pants amongst male Albanian Ghegs by village groups of the Malësorë or highlanders of the Kelmend, Berisha, Shala and Hoti tribes. They reserved use of the fustanella for elites during important and formal occasions such as dispute resolutions, election of local tribal representatives and allegiance declarations. In the middle of the 19th century, Albanian guerilla fighters abandoned the Turkish pants and begun wearing a kilt similar to the fustanella of the Greek Evzones. During the 1920s, the fustanella began to go out of fashion among Tosks being replaced with Western style clothing made by local tailors.

The Albanian fustanella has around sixty pleats, or usually a moderate number. It is made of heavy home-woven linen cloth. Historically, the skirt was long enough to cover the whole thigh (knee included), leaving only the lower leg exposed. It was usually worn by wealthy Albanians who would also expose an ornamented yataghan on the side and a pair of pistols with long-chiseled silver handles in the belt. The general custom in Albania was to dip the white skirts in melted sheep-fat for the double purpose of making them waterproof and less visible at a distance. Usually, this was done by the men-at-arms (called in Albanian trima). After being removed from the cauldron, the skirts were hung up to dry and then pressed with cold irons so as to create the pleats. They then had a dull gray appearance but were not dirty by any means. The jacket, worn with the fustanella in the Albanian costume, has a free armhole to allow for the passage of the arm, while the sleeves, attached only on the upper part of the shoulders, are thrown back. The sleeves are not usually worn even though the wearer has the option of putting them on. There are three types of footwear that complement the fustanella: 1) the kundra, which are black shoes with a metal buckle, 2) the sholla, which are sandals with leather thongs tied around a few inches above the ankle, 3) the opinga, which is a soft leather shoe, with turned-up points, which, when intended for children, are surmounted with a pompon of black or red wool.

Among the Greek population in southern Albania, a sigouni, a sleeveless coat made of thick white wool, is worn over the fustanella in the regions of Dropull and Tepelenë. In 1914, the newly formed Greek armed forces of the Autonomous Republic of Northern Epirus (1913–1914) consisted of military units wearing Evzone uniforms.

Aromanians

The Aromanians are an Eastern Romance-speaking people living in Albania, Bulgaria, Greece, North Macedonia, Romania and Serbia. In Aromanian rural areas, clothes differed from the dress of the city dwellers. The shape and the colour of a garment, the volume of the headgear, the shape of a jewel could indicate cultural affiliation and also could show the village people came from. Fustanella usage among Aromanians can be traced to at least the 15th century, with notable examples being seen in the Aromanian stećak of the Radimlja necropolis.

Bosnia and Herzegovina
In Bosnia and Herzegovina, the fustanella was worn by Aromanians who were registered in medieval times in these lands. Some of their tombstones contains petroglyphs with their fustanella.
Aromanians of Bosnia and Herzegovina were Serbianized and during time, some of them passed to Bogomilism and finally to Islam faith. Their tombstones were described by Marian Wenzel.

Egypt
The sizeable Albanian guards and janissary troops who settled on the banks of the Nile during the early rule of Mehmed Ali' dynasty were noted for their swagger, their weapons and their costumes, particularly for the pleats of their typical white fustanellas. Those costumes played a major role in Jean-Léon Gérôme's paintings.

Greece

According to one view, the fustanella was already in common use in Greek lands as early as the 12th century. Byzantine warriors, in particular the Akritai, wearing fustanella, are depicted in contemporary Byzantine art. On Byzantine pottery sherds from Greece, Cyprus, and Chersonesus, warriors are shown bearing weapons and wearing the heavy pleated fustanella. This is also confirmed by the Medieval Greek acritic songs of the 12th century; it has been suggested that 11th-century illuminated manuscripts of the songs served as prototypes for later depictions. The garment is also depicted on early 14th-century frescoes in the church of Saint Nicholas Orphanos in Thessaloniki, and the church of Holy Cross of Agiasmati in Cyprus. The full-pleated fustanella was worn by the Byzantine Akritic warriors originally as a military outfit, and seems to have been reserved for people of importance. It was frequently worn in conjunction with bows, swords, or battle-axes and frequently shown covered with a jointed corselet, or with a vest of chain mail. During the Ottoman period, the fustanella was also worn by Greek guerilla groups such as the klephts and armatoloi. Fustanella was a suitable garment for guerrilla mountain units, thus it was worn by the klephts of the Ottoman period for the same reason it was worn by the akritai warriors of the Byzantine era earlier. The first time the fustanella was worn as part of a standardised military uniform was by the Greek volunteers of the British army in 1813.

According to another view the fustanella is thought originally to have been a Tosk Albanian costume introduced into Greek territories during the Ottoman period, subsequently becoming part of the national dress of Greece as a consequence of the migration and settlement of them in the region. During the Greek War of Independence, resistance fighters adopted the dress of the Albanian soldiers, the fustanella. In the early 19th century, the costume's popularity rose among the Greek population. During this era of post-independence Greece, parts of Greek society such as townspeople shed their Turkish-style clothing and adopted the fustanella which symbolised solidarity with new Greek democracy. Philhellene enthusiasm for the fustanella survived knowledge of its Albanian origins. It became difficult thereafter to distinguish the fustanella as clothing worn by male Arvanites from clothing worn by wider parts of Greek society. According to Helen Angelomatis-Tsougarakis, its popularity in the Morea (Peloponnese) was attributed to the influence of the Arvanite community of Hydra and other Albanian-speaking settlements in the area. The Hydriotes however could not have played a significant role in its development since they did not wear the fustanella, but similar costumes to the other Greek islanders. In other regions of Greece the popularity of the fustanella was attributed to the elevation of Albanians as an Ottoman ruling class such as Ali Pasha, the semi-independent ruler of the Pashalik of Yanina. In those areas, its lightweight design and manageability in comparison to the clothing of the Greek upper classes of the era also made it fashionable amongst them in adopting the fustanella. Greek villagers of Albanian origin continued to wear the fustanella or the poukamiso (an elongated shirt) on a daily basis until the 20th century.

The fustanella worn by the Roumeliotes (Greeks of the mountainous interior) was the version chosen as the national costume of Greece in the early 19th century. Of the Roumeliotes, the nomadic Greek-speaking Sarakatsani pastoralists wore the fustanella. The Aromanians, a Latin-speaking people who lived within Greece also wore the fustanella. During the reign of King Othon I (1832–1862), the fustanella was adopted by the king, the royal court and the military, while it became a service uniform imposed on government officials to wear even when abroad. In terms of geographical spread, the fustanella never became part of the clothing worn in the Aegean islands, whereas in Crete it was associated with the heroes of the Greek War of Independence (1821) in local theatrical productions and seldom as a government uniform. The men of the Greek presidential guard, founded in 1868, wear the fustanella as part of their official dress. By the late 19th century, the popularity of the fustanella in Greece began to fade when Western-style clothing was introduced.

The fustanella film (or fustanella drama) was a popular genre in the Greek cinema from 1930s to 1960s. This genre emphasized on depictions of rural Greece and was focused on the differences between rural and urban Greece. In general it offered an idealized depiction of the Greek village, where the fustanella was a typical image. In Greece today, the garment is seen a relic of a past era with which most members of the younger generations do not identify.

The Greek fustanella differs from the Albanian fustanella in that the former garment has a higher number of pleats. For example, the "Bridegroom's coat", worn throughout the districts of Attica and Boeotia, was a type of Greek fustanella unique for its 200 pleats; a bride would purchase it as a wedding gift for her groom (if she could afford the garment). A fustanella is worn with a yileki (bolero), a mendani (waistcoat) and a fermeli (sleeveless coat). The selachi (leather belt) with gold or silver embroidery, is worn around the waist over the fustanella, in which the armatoloi and the klephts placed their arms.

During the 18th and early 19th centuries, the skirts hung below the knees and the hem of the garment was gathered together with garters while tucked into the boots to create a "bloused" effect. Later, during the Bavarian regency, the skirts were shortened to create a sort of billowy pantaloon that stopped above the knee; this garment was worn with hose, and either buskins or decorative clogs. This is the costume worn by the Evzones, light mountain troops of the Hellenic Army. Today it is still worn by the ceremonial Presidential Guard.

Italy

The fustanella has been in usage among the Arbëreshë people since their arrival in Italy. In the 18th century it was worn by the troops of the Albanian Regiment in the Kingdom of Naples. The fustanella has been a symbol of economic wealth among Arbëreshë people. It is worn by Arbëreshë men during festivals.

North Macedonia
In Macedonia, the fustanella was worn in the regions of Azot, Babuna, Gevgelija, the southern area of the South Morava, Ovče Pole, Lake Prespa, Skopska Blatija, and Tikveš. In that area, it is known as fustan, ajta, or toska. The use of the term toska could be attributed to the hypothesis that the costume was introduced to certain regions within Macedonia as a cultural borrowing from the Albanians of Toskëria (subregion of southern Albania).

Megleno-Romanians
The Megleno-Romanians, another Eastern Romance-speaking group living in Greece and North Macedonia, also wear fustanellas.

Moldova and Wallachia 
In the 18th and 19th centuries many foreign travellers recorded that the bodyguards of the princely courts of Moldova and Wallachia were dressed with the Albanian fustanella.

United States 
In the United States, the fustanella is identified with Albanian and Greek populations. It can be frequently seen in Albanian and Greek folk festivals and parades across the country.

Name
The word derives from Italian fustagno 'fustian' and -ella (diminutive), the fabric from which the earliest fustanella were made. This in turn derives from Medieval Latin fūstāneum, perhaps a diminutive form of fustis, "wooden baton". Other authors consider this a calque of Greek xylino (ξύλινο), literally "wooden" i.e. "cotton"; others speculate that it is derived from Fostat, a suburb of Cairo where cloth was manufactured.

Name in various languages
Words for "skirt" and "dress" included for comparison.

Gallery

See also

Kilt
Lava-lava
Sarong
Medieval Armour

References

Citations

Sources

External links
 Dictionary.com – "Fustanella"
 The Fustanella in Greece

Albanian clothing
Greek clothing
Bulgarian clothing
Macedonian clothing
National symbols of Albania
Skirts